Pretty Polly (also known as A Matter of Innocence) is a 1967 British comedy film directed by Guy Green and based on the short story Pretty Polly Barlow by Noël Coward. It stars Hayley Mills, Shashi Kapoor, Trevor Howard and Brenda De Banzie. The film is largely set in Singapore.

Plot
Miss Polly Barlow (Hayley Mills) decides to leave England and spend a few months with her wealthy spinster aunt as a traveling companion. While in Singapore, the sudden demise of her aunt (Brenda De Banzie) leaves her alone to pursue her freedom and explore an arms'-length romance with a local Indian Singaporean tour guide, Amaz (Shashi Kapoor).

Cast
Hayley Mills as Polly Barlow
Trevor Howard as Robert Hook
Shashi Kapoor as Amaz
Brenda de Banzie as Mrs. Innes-Hook
Dick Patterson as Rick Preston
Kalen Liu as Lorelei
Peter Bayliss as Critch
Patricia Routledge as Miss Gudgeon
Dorothy Alison as Mrs. Barlow
David Prosser as Ambrose
Toni Murphy as Lady Tourist
Ric Young as Lim Kee (as Eric Young)
Sarah Abdullah  
Anthony Chinn as Japanese Proprietor
S.Y. Han as Oculist

Original story
The film was based on Pretty Polly Barlow, a short story by Noël Coward. It was published in 1964 in a three-story collection titled Pretty Polly and Other Stories.

Coward wrote in his diary on 27 December 1964 that the collection "has not received one really good notice. A few quite good, a lot very bad and all brief and patronising. It is foolish for a writer constantly to decry the critics; it is also foolish, I think, for the critic to so constantly decry anyone who writes as well as I do." Coward admitted the story Pretty Polly Barlow was "conventional in theme, but it is at moments very funny and eminently readable."

1966 British television version
The story was sold to British television. On 21 March 1965, Coward wrote that William Marchant, who adapted it "has done a fine job on the television script of Pretty Polly, so good is it that I would like him to do the movie script as well."

The British televised film of the short story, starring Lynn Redgrave and Donald Houston, aired in July 1966 as part of Armchair Theatre. Bill Bain directed it.

Cast
Lynn Redgrave as Polly Barlow
Donald Houston as Robert Hook
Zia Mohyeddin as Amaz
Stuart Cooper as Rick Barlow
Vincent Harding as Gunther
Dandy Nichols as Mrs. Innes Hook
Leon Sinden as Archie Critch
Derek Smee as Ambrose
Lillias Walker as Miss Gudgeon

Film production
On 16 May 1965, Coward wrote "there have been great complications over the Pretty Polly film deal but we hope that everything will be straightened out."

In November 1965, it was reported that the film rights had been purchased by the Broadway producing team of George W George and Frank Granat, who would make the movie in association with Universal. Filming was to start the next June in Hong Kong with interiors shot in London. Keith Waterhouse and Willis Hall were signed to write the screenplay, and Coward would write a title song.

The film was part of a slate of four movies that Universal was making in Britain under the auspices of Jay Kanter, the studio's head of operations there. The other films were The Countess from Hong Kong, Fahrenheit 451 and Charlie Bubbles.

Filming was delayed a number of months. In June 1966, it was announced that Sidney J. Furie may direct. In September 1966, it was announced that Noël Coward would direct the film, which would star Carol Lynley, who had just made Bunny Lake is Missing (1965) with Coward. However, by December Hayley Mills was signed to star, with Guy Green to direct.

Mills had recently done a nude scene for The Family Way and formed a relationship with that film's director, Roy Boulting. Of her Pretty Polly role, she said, "No nude scenes but it's pretty sexy."

The male lead went to Shashi Kapoor on the strength of his performance in Shakespeare Wallah. He was the first Indian to play the lead in an international film.

Shooting
Filming began in Singapore in February 1967. The cast and crew were based at Raffles Hotel. After six weeks in Singapore, the unit relocated to Pinewood Studios in London. The film's sets were designed by the art director Peter Mullins.

The title song was composed by Michel Legrand and sung by Matt Munro.

Reception
On 22 June 1967, Coward wrote in his diary:
I... watched, with mounting irritation, the film of Pretty Polly which, as I deduced from the first script, was common, unsubtle and vulgar. Nobody was good in it and Trevor Howard was horrid. When I think of his charm and subtley in Brief Encounter. Hayley, poor child, did her best, but there was no hope with that script and that director. Guy Green should have remained a cameraman.
Filmink argued the film "all seems very slight. It lacks something – extra characterisation, location footage, a plot twist" adding Mills was "actually quite good in the part, incidentally – better than the film, something that would become a recurring theme in her later career."

Notes

See also
Pollyanna (1960 film)

References

External links
 
1966 TV version at IMDb
Extended review of film

1967 films
1960s English-language films
Films directed by Guy Green
Films shot at Pinewood Studios
Films set in Singapore
Films based on short fiction
British comedy films
1967 comedy films
1960s British films